Are You There? is a 1931 American pre-Code comedy film directed by Hamilton MacFadden and written by Harlan Thompson. The film stars Beatrice Lillie, John Garrick, Olga Baclanova, George Grossmith Jr., Roger Davis and Jillian Sand. The film was released on May 3, 1931, by Fox Film Corporation.

Cast    
Beatrice Lillie as Shirley Travis 
John Garrick as Lord Geoffrey Troon
Olga Baclanova as Countess Helenka
George Grossmith Jr. as Duke of St. Pancras
Roger Davis as Barber
Jillian Sand as Barbara Blythe
Gustav von Seyffertitz as Barber
Nicholas Soussanin as Barber
Richard Alexander as International crook
Henry Victor as International crook
Lloyd Hamilton as Hostler
Paula Langlen as Page

References

External links
 

1931 films
American comedy films
1931 comedy films
Fox Film films
Films directed by Hamilton MacFadden
American black-and-white films
1930s English-language films
1930s American films